Canfield Mesa is an ice-free Antarctic mesa of  extent, located  east-northeast of Green Mesa in the western part of the Insel Range, Victoria Land. It was named by the Advisory Committee on Antarctic Names in 1997, after Donald E. Canfield, School of Interdisciplinary Studies, Miami University, Oxford, Ohio, who made a geochemical analysis of the Onyx River and of Lake Vanda with William J. Green in the 1980–81, 1986–87, and 1987–88 field seasons.
.

References 

Mesas of Antarctica
Landforms of Victoria Land
McMurdo Dry Valleys